The National Higher Secondary School, Mannargudi (NHSS) is a school in Mannargudi, India. It was established in 1899 by Sri Singaravel Udaiyar and Sri Ramadurai Iyer. It uses English and Tamil as its languages of instruction. 

The school conducts science exhibitions and participates in NSS activities. It features vocational studies as a course choice.

Social activities of the school in the media
 Centenary celebrations
 More Centenary celebrations
 NSS activities
 Schools towards residences of students
 Kit that could produce oxygen
 National Higher Secondary School stadium/ground

High schools and secondary schools in Tamil Nadu
Tiruvarur district
Educational institutions established in 1899
1899 establishments in India